Craver is a surname. Notable people with the surname include:

 Aaron Craver (born 1968), American former National Football League player
 Bill Craver (1844–1901), American Major League Baseball player
 Forrest Craver (1875–1958), American college football player and coach and athletic director
 Harrison Warwick Craver (1875–1951), American librarian and educator
 Keyuo Craver (born 1980), American football defensive back
 Margret Craver (1907–2010), American jeweler, metalsmith and arts educator
 Nathaniel Craver (2002–2009), Russian child adopted by American citizens who were later convicted of involuntary manslaughter in his death
 Theodore F. Craver Jr., American former chairman, president and chief executive officer of Edison International